Richard Garcia Miranda da Silva (born 15 October 1975), commonly known as Miran, is a Brazilian footballer who last played for Luxembourg club FC Mamer 32 as a centre forward.

Football career
Born in São Paulo, Miran started playing organized football already well into his 20s. In 2001, he moved to Portugal and signed with S.C. Braga, being relatively used during his sole season as the team finished in tenth position.

Miran continued playing in the country in six of the following seven years, helping C.F. Estrela da Amadora promote to the Primeira Liga in 2003 with a career-best ten goals in 28 games. He also represented, always in the second division, C.D. Santa Clara, S.C. Beira-Mar, Portimonense S.C. and Varzim SC. In the 2007–08 campaign he played in Bulgaria, with FC Vihren Sandanski.

In late March 2010, after a brief spell in Angola, Miran joined English club Atherstone Town after his international clearance was granted. He made his debut as a substitute in a 0–1 home defeat against Woodford United, on 10 April.

After one season back in Portugal with lowly C.D. Pinhalnovense, Miran returned to top flight football in Luxembourg, with FC Progrès Niedercorn. He continued competing in the latter nation in the next years, representing SC Steinfort, FC UNA Strassen and FC Mamer 32.

References

External links

1975 births
Living people
Footballers from São Paulo
Brazilian footballers
Association football forwards
Campeonato Brasileiro Série B players
Sampaio Corrêa Futebol Clube players
Primeira Liga players
Liga Portugal 2 players
Segunda Divisão players
S.C. Braga players
C.F. Estrela da Amadora players
C.D. Santa Clara players
S.C. Beira-Mar players
Portimonense S.C. players
Varzim S.C. players
C.D. Pinhalnovense players
First Professional Football League (Bulgaria) players
OFC Vihren Sandanski players
Atherstone Town F.C. players
Brazilian expatriate footballers
Expatriate footballers in Portugal
Expatriate footballers in Bulgaria
Expatriate footballers in Angola
Expatriate footballers in England
Expatriate footballers in Luxembourg
Brazilian expatriate sportspeople in Portugal
Brazilian expatriate sportspeople in Bulgaria
Brazilian expatriate sportspeople in Angola
Brazilian expatriate sportspeople in England
Brazilian expatriate sportspeople in Luxembourg
FC UNA Strassen players
FC Mamer 32 players